Evolution Skateboarding is a sports video game released by Konami for the GameCube and PlayStation 2 in 2002. It includes several popular skateboarders such as Rick McCrank, Arto Saari, Kerry Getz, and Danny Way. There is also a create-a-skater feature and an unlockable character for every skater the player completes the game as. There are also sets of level specific songs such as a metal-remix of the Metal Gear Solid theme and a Castlevania theme after unlocking the Vampire Hunter. Levels are unlocked by beating a certain amount of objectives in a current level, such as collecting items like boots and other objects, performing tricks in certain areas of a level, and grinding a certain amount of meters. The Evolution Skateboarding engine was used in the bonus skateboarding mode included in the PlayStation 2 version of Metal Gear Solid 2: Substance in 2003.

Featured skaters
Default skaters
 Arto Saari
Danny Way
Colin McKay
 Stevie Williams
Rick McCrank
Kerry Getz
Chris Senn

Unlockable skaters
 Gorilla
 Raiden
 Unknown
 Solid Snake
 Frogger
 Gurlukovich 1
 Vampire Hunter
 Gurlukovich 2
Gray

Soundtrack
 H2O - "Role Model"
 Stereo MC's - "Graffiti Part One"
 Primus - "Harold of the Rocks"
 Primus - "Mr Knowitall"
 Primus - "Pudding Time"
 cKy - "The Human Drive in Hi-Fi"
 The Turbo A.C.'s - "Hit and Run"
 Hotwire - "Not Today"
 Agent Orange - "Let It Burn"
 Default - "Slow Me Down"
 Unwritten Law - "Evolution"
 Ill Niño - "Unreal"
 The Dickies - "Elevator"
 Kurtis Mantronik - "Baby, You Blow My Mind"
 Peanut Butter Wolf - "Devotion"

Reception

The game received "generally unfavorable reviews" on both platforms according to the review aggregation website Metacritic. It is mostly considered as a bland rip-off of the Tony Hawk's series of skating games. In Japan, however, Famitsu gave both console versions each a score of 31 out of 40.

References

2002 video games
Cancelled Game Boy Advance games
GameCube games
Konami games
PlayStation 2 games
Skateboarding video games
Video games set in Philadelphia
Video games set in Greece
Video games developed in Japan